Harrie Van Leeuwen (29 July 1945 – 31 December 2009) was a Dutch racing cyclist. He rode in the 1972 Tour de France.

References

1945 births
2009 deaths
Dutch male cyclists
Place of birth missing